Jephson, a surname, may refer to:
Anthony Jephson (disambiguation), name of multiple people
Arthur Jephson (1859–1908), English merchant seaman and army officer
Denham Jephson (disambiguation), name of multiple people
Digby Jephson (1871–1926), English cricketer
John Jephson (disambiguation), name of multiple people
Paul Jephson, who disappeared from the Bennington Triangle in 1950
Robert Jephson (1736–1803), Irish dramatist and politician
Selwyn Jephson (1900–1978), English cricketer
William Jephson (disambiguation), name of multiple people

Middle name
Peter Jephson Cameron (born 1947), Australian mathematician
Robert Jephson Jones (1905–1985), British Army officer

Others
Jephson baronets
Jephson family
Jephson Gardens

English-language surnames